Missouri was admitted to the union on August 10, 1821, but elections had been held August 28, 1820.

See also 
 1820 and 1821 United States House of Representatives elections
 List of United States representatives from Missouri

References 

1820
Missouri
United States House of Representatives